Thomas-Fortin Ecological Reserve is an ecological reserve in Quebec, Canada. It was established on May 8, 1990.

References

External links
 Official website from Government of Québec

Protected areas of Capitale-Nationale
Nature reserves in Quebec
Protected areas established in 1990
1990 establishments in Quebec

Laurentides Wildlife Reserve